is a dam in Takayama, Gifu Prefecture, Japan, completed in 1962.

References 

Dams in Gifu Prefecture
Dams completed in 1962
Takayama, Gifu